Penn & Teller Tell a Lie is a six-part series starring Penn Jillette and Teller. Each episode contains six or seven stories, including a demonstration performed by the hosts during the recording of the show as the last story.  One of the stories is falsified, and the rest are true. During each broadcast, viewers can guess which story is the lie, voting on Discovery's website, with the answer and voting results revealed at the end of the episode.

The series aired on the Discovery Channel beginning Wednesday, October 5, 2011. 
The show is also broadcast in the UK on Channel Quest which premiered on the 2nd of May 2012.

Development
On April 14, 2011, Penn and Teller announced that their previous show, Penn & Teller: Bullshit!, had ended and that a new show, Penn & Teller: Secrets of the Universe, would begin on the Discovery Channel. The show was later renamed Penn & Teller Tell a Lie.

Recording of the first episode began on June 1, 2011. The show started airing Wednesday, October 5, 2011.

Critical reception
Reviews of the show have been mostly positive, although many reviewers compare the show to the Discovery Channel's other skepticism-themed show, MythBusters. Matt Blum of Wired Magazine wrote:

Brian Lowry of Variety wrote that the show was "A perfect companion for Mythbusters" and "a clever way for Discovery to ventilate its whimsical side without pandering".   Kevin McFarland of The A.V. Club called the show a mix of the icebreaker game "Two Truths And A Lie" mixed with a "Mythbusters-type reality show". He went on to say that the show was "sincerely watchable", but noted that "there are still kinks to be worked out".

Episodes

References

External links 

 

2011 American television series debuts
Discovery Channel original programming
American non-fiction television series
Scientific skepticism mass media
2011 American television series endings